The albumen print, also called albumen silver print, was published in January 1847 by Louis Désiré Blanquart-Evrard, and was the first commercially exploitable method of producing a photographic print on a paper base from a negative. It used the albumen found in egg whites to bind the photographic chemicals to the paper and became the dominant form of photographic positives from 1855 to the start of the 20th century, with a peak in the 1860–90 period.  During the mid-19th century, the carte de visite became one of the more popular uses of the albumen method. In the 19th century, E. & H. T. Anthony & Company were the largest makers and distributors of albumen photographic prints and paper in the United States.

Creation process

 A piece of paper, usually 100% cotton, is coated with an emulsion of egg white (albumen) and salt (sodium chloride or ammonium chloride), then dried. The albumen seals the paper and creates a slightly glossy surface for the sensitizer to rest on.
 The paper is then dipped in a solution of silver nitrate and water which renders the surface sensitive to UV light.
 The paper is then dried in the absence of UV light.
 The dried, prepared paper is placed in a frame in direct contact under a negative. The negative is traditionally a glass negative with collodion emulsion, but this step can be performed with a modern silver halide negative, too. The paper with negative is then exposed to light until the image achieves the desired level of darkness, which is typically a little lighter than the end product. The progress of the print can be checked during the exposure as it is a printing-out process and the image can be seen taking form as it is being exposed to light. Though direct sunlight was used long ago, a UV exposure unit is often used contemporarily because it is more predictable, as the paper is most sensitive to ultraviolet light.
 A bath of sodium thiosulfate fixes the print’s exposure, preventing further darkening.
 Optional gold or selenium toning improves the photograph’s tone and stabilizes against fading. Depending on the toner, toning may be performed before or after fixing the print.

Because the image emerges as a direct result of exposure to light, without the aid of a developing solution, an albumen print may be said to be a printed rather than a developed photograph.

The table salt (sodium chloride) in the albumen emulsion forms silver chloride when in contact with silver nitrate. Silver chloride is unstable when exposed to light, which makes it decompose into silver and chlorine. The silver ion (Ag+) is reduced to silver (Ag) by addition of an electron during the development/printing process, and the remaining silver chloride is washed out during fixing. The black parts of the image are formed by metallic silver (Ag).

References

 Marshall, F.A.S. Photography: the importance of its applications in preserving pictorial records. Containing a practical description of the Talbotype process (London: Hering & Remington; Peterborough, T Chadwell & J Clarke, 1855).

External links 
 George Eastman House "Photographic Process 3.0: The Albumen Process" (archived 27 October 2016)
 Old Photos of Japan — Samples of hand-tinted albumen photographs
 Albumen prints from the American University in Cairo Rare Books and Special Collections Digital Library (archived 7 November 2012)
 Albumen Photographs: history, science and preservation
 
  
 Photos of Japan — A collection of hand-painted Japanese albumen prints
Albumen prints from the University of Michigan Museum of Art

Photographic processes dating from the 19th century